Kola Sámi Association is a public organization founded in 1989 to support Russian Sámi living in Murmansk Oblast and to promote their culture and languages. Its headquarters are in Murmansk, Russia.

, Elena Yakovleva Semenovna serves as the association’s president.

The Kola Sámi Association is a member of the Russian Association of Indigenous Peoples of the North (RAIPON) and, together with the Association of Sámi in Murmansk Oblast, a member association of the Saami Council.

References

External links
 Kola Sámi Association VK page

Sámi associations
Saami Council
Sámi in Russia
Murmansk Oblast
Indigenous rights organizations in Europe